Miroslav Koubek (born 1 September 1951) is a Czech former goalkeeper and manager.

Coaching career
Koubek coached several Czech clubs. He placed second with FC Zenit Čáslav in Czech Second League in 2008–09 season. In the 2009–10 Czech First League, he led FC Baník Ostrava to the third place in the league table. The 2010–11 season however started with miserable results for Baník, with the club losing seven of the opening 13 matches, and Koubek was sacked in October.

Koubek returned to the Czech First League as the manager of Mladá Boleslav on 28 May 2011. Koubek led Boleslav to fourth place in the 2011–12 Czech First League and qualification for the following season's UEFA Europa League. However, after a run of three consecutive league defeats, he resigned from his position in September 2012. Koubek was appointed to the manager's position at Slavia Prague in September 2013 following the resignation of former boss Michal Petrouš. He was sacked in March 2014. In August 2014 he became the new manager of FC Viktoria Plzeň and in May 2015 won his first league title. On 30 May 2016 Koubek was announced as the new manager of Bohemians 1905. Koubek was appointed to the manager's position at Hradec Králové in June 2021 following the resignation of manager Zdenko Frťala.

Honours

Managerial
 SK Kladno
Czech Second League (1): 2005–06
 FC Viktoria Plzeň
Czech First League (1): 2014–15
Czech Supercup (1): 2015

Managerial statistics

References

External links
  FC Baník Ostrava profile

1951 births
Living people
Czechoslovak footballers
AC Sparta Prague players
SK Kladno players
Czech football managers
Czechoslovak football managers
Czech First League managers
SK Kladno managers
FC Viktoria Plzeň managers
FK Čáslav managers
FC Baník Ostrava managers
FK Mladá Boleslav managers
SK Slavia Prague managers
Association football goalkeepers
Footballers from Prague
Bohemians 1905 managers
FC Hradec Králové managers
Czech National Football League managers